Canelo is a ghost town in eastern Santa Cruz County, Arizona, between the Canelo Hills and the northern end of the Huachuca Mountains. Today, several historic buildings listed on the National Register of Historic Places remain standing in Canelo, including a one-room schoolhouse and a United States Forest Service ranger station.

Name
"Canelo" is an alternative spelling of the Spanish word "canela", which means "cinnamon" in English. The town of Canelo gets its name from the Canelo Hills, which have a light brownish or cinnamon colored appearance when viewed from the south. It was originally spelled "Canille", but was later changed to "Canela" and finally to "Canelo" over the following years.

History
The Canelo area was first settled in the late 19th century by Captain Joe Parks, who arrived in 1882 to homestead along Turkey Creek. A post office wasn't opened until after the turn of the century in 1904. The local Forest Ranger and area resident, Robert A. Rodgers, was the first postmaster and the man responsible for naming the little town, which boasted a general store, a post office, a schoolhouse and a few homes in its heyday in the 1920s and 1930s. Robert's wife Annie took over the post office in 1906 and was in turn succeeded by another pioneer named Addie Parker in 1910.

The Canelo School was built in 1912 and remained open until 1948. Today the building is listed on the National Register of Historic Places and was the home to Canelo Cowboy Church from April 16, 2006 until May 16, 2016. The building has also been used as a community center, country store and funeral home for burials in Black Oak Cemetery, which opened in 1917 on land allotted by the Forest Service. The cemetery is open to burial free-of-charge to all local pioneers, which is anyone who lived in the Canelo area before December 1952. It is also free for those who already have family buried in the cemetery.

Canelo Ranger Station was established in 1932 and listed on the National Register of Historic Places in 1993. Five historic buildings are located on the site, including the ranger station office, residence, garage, pumphouse and barn, all of which were built of adobe brick by members of the Forest Service and the Civilian Conservation Corps in the early 1930s. The ranger station, northwest of the schoolhouse on Membrillo Lane, is still in use by the Forest Service and is no longer open to visitors.

Gallery

See also

 List of ghost towns in Arizona

References

External links
 Canelo at Ghosttowns.com

Ghost towns in Arizona
Cemeteries in Arizona
Former populated places in Santa Cruz County, Arizona
1904 establishments in Arizona Territory
History of Santa Cruz County, Arizona
Populated places established in 1904